The Self-Published Fantasy Blog-Off (SPFBO) is an annual literary contest intended to bring greater visibility to self-published English-language fantasy authors. 

The SPFBO has been operated since 2015 by the author Mark Lawrence. He distributes about 300 novels submitted by the authors to ten fantasy bloggers to review. Each blogger selects a finalist, which is then reviewed by all ten bloggers. The winner is the finalist with the highest average review score. 

The contest has been credited with making high-quality self-published novels discoverable, and with boosting the careers of the winners. Though not the primary purpose, it has helped several authors find publishing contracts. These include Jonathan French, the 2016 winner, and Josiah Bancroft, whose book Senlin Ascends, despite losing out before the final stage of the same competition, was reviewed so positively that it gained widespread attention in the fantasy community.

Winners

Finalists

SPFBO 1 (2015)

SPFBO 2 (2016)

SPFBO 3 (2017)

SPFBO 4 (2018)

SPFBO 5 (2019)

SPFBO 6 (2020)

SPFBO 7 (2021)

SPFBO 8 (2022)

External links 

 SFPBO homepage

References

Fantasy awards
2015 establishments
English-language literary awards